Suburban Technical School was located in Hempstead, New York, in the United States.

Programs Offered
Medical Assistant: upon completion, students are able to work in entry-level health care positions.

They originally offered an Electronic Technology Diploma for a 900 hrs course.

Accreditation Information
Suburban Technical School was accredited by the Accrediting Commission of Career Schools and Colleges of Technology to award diplomas. As of September 2012, the school is no longer open.

References

The Accrediting Commission of Career Schools and Colleges of Technology
Official Site, Suburban Technical School

External links
ACCSCT
Official Site, Suburban Tech

Private universities and colleges in New York (state)